Jewish Voice for Labour (JVL) is an organisation formed in 2017 for Jewish members of the UK Labour Party. Its aims include a commitment "to strengthen the party in its opposition to all forms of racism, including anti-Semitism... to uphold the right of supporters of justice for Palestinians to engage in solidarity activities" and "to oppose attempts to widen the definition of antisemitism beyond its meaning of hostility towards, or discrimination against, Jews as Jews".

Launch
JVL was inaugurated in July 2017, and Jenny Manson, an activist in Jews for Justice for Palestinians and former Labour councillor, was elected chair.

The organisation was officially launched on 24 September, on the second day of the Labour Party Conference in Brighton, with over 300 people in attendance, according to JVL. The launch featured historian and Oxford University professor of international relations Professor Avi Shlaim, former Court of Appeal judge Sir Stephen Sedley, and the Jewish Socialist Group's David Rosenberg.

Purposes
JVL describes itself as a "network for Jewish members of the Labour Party" which "stand for rights and justice for Jewish people everywhere and against wrongs and injustice to Palestinians and other oppressed people anywhere". The organisation's founding statement advocated "making the Labour Party an open, democratic and inclusive party, encouraging all ethnic groups and cultures to join and participate freely" and to support a commitment "to strengthen the party in its opposition to all forms of racism, including antisemitism". Its aims were set out in a statement of principles, which include a commitment "to strengthen the party in its opposition to all forms of racism, including antisemitism, to uphold the right of supporters of justice for Palestinians to engage in solidarity activities" and "to oppose attempts to widen the definition of antisemitism beyond its meaning of hostility towards, or discrimination against, Jews as Jews".

Although JVL has been described as "anti-Zionist", Manson has said the organisation is "not anti-Zionist" and stated that it was "an alternative voice for Jewish members of Labour" who do not support the Jewish Labour Movement's (JLM) "profoundly Zionist orientation". JVL's information officer Jonathan Rosenhead shares the latter opinion. The organisation's Secretary, Glyn Secker, wrote that JVL has "established a very different, authentic, radical, and socialist Jewish narrative to that promulgated by the Jewish Labour Movement and Labour Friends of Israel". JVL's media officer Naomi Wimborne-Idrissi wrote that one of JVL's roles "is to clarify the distinction between Jew, Israeli and Zionist so that people are less likely to fall into antisemitic generalisation when talking about Israel's role in Palestine", to offer "an alternative to the JLM's pro-Israel agenda" and that the JLM does not have "the right to speak as the Jewish Labour Movement on behalf of all Jews in the Labour party". Co-Chairs Jenny Manson and Leah Levane "contend that the JLM cannot represent all Jewish members of the Labour Party when it is committed 'to promote the centrality of Israel in Jewish life' as well as the wider Jerusalem Programme of the World Zionist Organization".

The organisation's motto is "Always with the oppressed; never with the oppressor" which paraphrases a quote by Marek Edelman, the last surviving commander of the Warsaw Uprising.

Membership
JVL only admits full membership to Labour Party members who identify as Jewish. In August 2019, JVL said that it had full members in a quarter of constituency Labour parties. All other members are associate members without voting rights, as the constitution specifies that the organisation is led by Jewish people and only they can vote on its policies. JVL does not make promoting the centrality of Israel to Jewish life a condition of membership" which is a requirement for membership of the JLM. Committee member Ian Saville has clarified that "There is no ideological test to join" and it is "a group for Jews in the Labour Party that would welcome all Jews, whatever their attitude to Israel".

Affiliations
Naomi Wimborne-Idrissi has said the organisation's "longer term aim" could be to affiliate to Labour. Several constituency Labour parties have affiliated to JVL. The organisation has been endorsed by leaders of Labour-affiliated trade unions, namely Len McCluskey, General Secretary of Unite the Union; and Tosh McDonald, president of ASLEF. JVL is affiliated to both the Campaign for Labour Party Democracy (CLPD) and the Centre-Left Grassroots Alliance (CLGA). The organisation has additionally formed a coalition with Red Labour and the Labour Representation Committee, both of which are also members of the CLGA.

In December 2017, The Times of Israel wrote that JVL was closely linked to Free Speech on Israel (FSOI), which was founded in 2016 to "counter the manufactured moral panic over a supposed epidemic of anti-Semitism in the UK". FSOI opposes Zionism and the notion that anti-Zionism is antisemitism. Wimborne-Idrissi said JVL and FSOI are "two separate organizations with different aims and objectives".

Founder of JVL, Wimborne-Idrissi, a member of the National Executive Committee of the Labour Party, was excluded from the Labour party in December 2022.

Assessment
Len McCluskey called the formation of JVL a "positive move forward". David Rosenberg, author and founding member of the Jewish Socialists' Group, described JVL as "a broader, more inclusive, more open-minded group — not fixated on defending Israel...". Labour Party leader, Jeremy Corbyn has said JVL are "committed to fighting anti-Semitism and making sure there is a Jewish voice in the party. We already have the Jewish Labour Movement. JVL was established last year and I think it is good that we have organisations within the party that are giving that voice to people." Writer Richard Seymour described the organisation as "rooted in radical and revolutionary internationalism". Stephen Sedley stated that "...pro-Israeli groups such as the Jewish Labour Movement [are] seeking to drive out pro-Palestinian groups like the Jewish Voice for Labour by stigmatising them..."

The organisation has been described as controversial. The Jewish Labour Movement has called its views an "extreme fringe". Jewish Leadership Council chairman Jonathan Goldstein has said that JVL is "not representative of our community". Board of Deputies of British Jews President Marie van der Zyl has referred to JVL as "a tiny organisation whose odious views are representative of no-one but themselves". Jon Lansman, founder of Momentum, stated that JVL "is an organisation which is not just tiny but has no real connection with the Jewish community at all" and "It doesn't represent the Jewish community in a way that JLM clearly does represent the Labour wing of the Jewish community." Luke Akehust, director of We Believe in Israel and secretary of Labour First, has called for JVL to be proscribed.

History
JVL has defended former Mayor of London Ken Livingstone, supported Jackie Walker as being a victim of a "vituperative campaign... based on this sliver of quasi-fact", deemed accusations of antisemitism against Moshé Machover as "ill founded", opposed and condemned the expulsion of Marc Wadsworth as being "punished in advance of investigation and hearing of the case", welcomed the lifting of Derby North MP Chris Williamson's suspension and called the National Executive Committee's ruling not to endorse him as a Labour candidate for the 2019 general election a "dangerous development for everyone who stands for justice for Palestinians and for democracy and freedom of expression in Britain, including within Labour."

2017
At the 2017 Labour Conference, JVL supported Hastings and Rye Constituency Labour Party's proposal to change the Labour Party Rule Book to add a clause which makes it clear that antisemitism will not be tolerated, whilst clarifying that "hatred of Jews shall not be evidenced by non-abusive words or actions regarding Israel or zionism that are part of legitimate political discourse." The organisation opposed the International Holocaust Remembrance Alliance's working definition of antisemitism being formally adopted by the Labour Party for disciplinary purposes at the 2017 Conference, which it sees as "attempts to widen the definition of antisemitism beyond its meaning of hostility towards, or discrimination against, Jews as Jews". JVL sees the rule change, supported by Jeremy Corbyn, as an "anti-democratic restriction on political debate".

2018
JVL has challenged "unjustified allegations of antisemitism" which are "used to undermine Jeremy Corbyn's leadership". In March 2018, JVL organised a smaller counter-demonstration, attended by around 30 people, according to The Independent, at a protest against antisemitism in the Labour Party, held in Parliament Square, London. In a statement, JVL said it was "appalled" by the Board of Deputies of British Jews' letter and that "They do not represent us or the great majority of Jews in the party who share Jeremy Corbyn's vision for social justice and fairness. Jeremy's consistent commitment to anti-racism is all the more needed now." Chair of JVL, Jenny Manson defended Corbyn on BBC's Daily Politics, saying Corbyn had taken "enormously strong action" to deal with the issue of anti-semitism in the Labour Party. In April, Manson appeared on BBC Radio 4's Today programme, and, referring to a survey conducted by the Campaign Against Antisemitism, said: "Evidence, including very recent evidence, commissioned by a Jewish body suggests the very worst antisemitism is still on the right, on the far right and always has been".

In the same month, JVL issued a statement saying they "strongly condemn the Israeli army's violent response to the Land Day demonstration in Gaza, killing 15 Palestinian civilians and wounding hundreds more" and called "for an unconditional end to Israel's inhuman siege of Gaza and its brutal occupation of the West Bank which has destroyed the lives of generations of Palestinians."

In May, JVL with members of Free Speech on Israel produced a definition of antisemitism as: Antisemitism is a form of racism: hatred, hostility, discrimination or prejudice against Jews because they are Jews. It may be manifested in violence; denial of rights; direct, indirect or institutional discrimination; prejudice-based behaviour; or verbal or written statements. Such manifestations draw on stereotypes – characteristics which all Jews are presumed to share.

The Labour Party's code of conduct definition of antisemitism was adopted by the National Executive Committee (NEC) for the purposes of disciplinary cases brought before the National Constitutional Committee. In July, JVL said that Labour's code of conduct "offers a constructive framework for moving forward in this difficult area" and it encouraged "free speech on issues to do with Israel and its treatment of the Palestinians, and with Zionism" but "much will depend on how this code of conduct is applied in practice, particularly in disciplinary cases. We are cautiously optimistic." In the same month, the organisation was one of 41 Jewish organisations in 15 countries, including six in the UK, to criticise the IHRA definition of anti-semitism. In August, the organisation called for support of Labour's existing code of conduct and for the NEC to resist adopting the IHRA examples of antisemitism as it fell short of providing "a clear and unambiguous statement based on attitudes to Jews as Jews, not attitudes to a country, Israel". In the same month, JVL asked its members for help in delivering an "expanded programme" of antisemitism training to party members in response to what it called a "growing number of requests".

In August, JVL complained to BBC Director-General Tony Hall and the BBC's news and current affairs director Francesca Unsworth about the broadcaster's "lack of impartiality and inaccuracies" and "biased" coverage of Labour MP Margaret Hodge's allegations of antisemitism against Jeremy Corbyn.

In September, JVL and Free Speech on Israel published a joint declaration on antisemitic misconduct. JVL contributed to the consultation on Labour's code of conduct by rejecting suggestions that comparisons between Israel and "features of pre-war Nazi Germany" or apartheid-era South Africa were "inherently antisemitic", arguing that "Drawing such parallels can undoubtedly cause offence; but potent historical events and experiences are always key reference points in political debate. Such comparisons are only anti-Semitic if they show prejudice, hostility or hatred against Jews as Jews." The JVL's guidelines on antisemitism included the view that "Jews, Israelis and Zionists are separate categories that are too frequently conflated by both supporters and critics of Israel. This conflation can be anti-Semitic. Holding all Jews responsible for the actions of the Israeli government is anti-Semitic. Many Jews are not Zionist." The organisation also suggested that "discussion and education, rather than a formal disciplinary approach" could be more appropriate in some cases of antisemitism.

In September, at the Labour Party Conference, JVL hosted two events: "Israel/Palestine: Antisemitism" and "Fighting The Far Right". JVL also organised and hosted the premiere of the documentary film The Political Lynching of Jackie Walker, from which 200 people were evacuated after a bomb threat. In a statement, the organisation said the film "is an incisive and chilling exposé of attempts to silence critics of Israel, in particular those who support the socialist project of Labour leader Jeremy Corbyn. It connects the global struggle against racism and the far right with the Palestinian cause."

2019
In February 2019, over 200 Jewish members and supporters of Labour signed a JVL open letter calling the party under Corbyn an "a crucial ally in the fight against bigotry and reaction" and noted Corbyn's consistent campaigning in support of "initiatives against antisemitism". They also welcomed Labour's support for "freedom of expression on Israel and on the rights of Palestinians". They felt that there was a "disproportionate focus on antisemitism on the left, which is abhorrent but relatively rare." The signatories included Prof David Epstein, Mike Leigh, Prof Michael Rosen, Prof Avi Shlaim, Gillian Slovo, Prof Annabelle Sreberny, Walter Wolfgang, Peter Buckman, Erica Burman, Keith Burstein, Miriam David, Michael Ellman, Nick Foster, Susan Himmelweit, Selma James, Ann Jungman, Frank Land, Gillian McCall, Helen Pearson and Ian Saville.

In July, JVL criticised BBC Panorama documentary Is Labour Anti-Semitic?. In a statement, the organisation said: "It is shameful that the BBC has joined in an orchestrated campaign whose principal aim is quite clearly to prevent Jeremy Corbyn becoming prime minister of a Labour government committed to socialism."

In August, JVL welcomed the investigation by the Equality and Human Rights Commission (EHRC) into the handling of antisemitism by the Labour Party. The organisation submitted a dossier in response to the EHRC's request for evidence. JVL held that, by failing to make public the initial complaints they received justifying the investigation and Labour's initial response to the EHRC, the EHRC have violated the Equality Act 2006 which requires that they specify who is being investigated and "the nature of the unlawful act" they are suspected of committing, both required by its own terms of reference. Signatories to JVL's letter included Oxford University professor Avi Shlaim and human rights lawyer Sir Geoffrey Bindman QC.

In the same month, JVL stated that "pressure was put on organisers" of the Greenbelt Festival which withdrew an invitation to one of its co-chairs, Leah Levane, to sit on a panel. The Festival said that it "must make it clear that Leah was not coming as a representative or spokesperson for the Jewish community in the UK". Similar venue denying campaigns have been mounted against Jackie Walker, Chris Williamson and Labour Against the Witchhunt.

In September, at the Labour Party Conference, JVL organised a "Let's Talk About Palestine" fringe event attended by 200 people at the Mercure Hotel featuring JVL's political officer Graham Bash, Israeli historian Professor Ilan Pappé and former Palestinian Knesset member Haneen Zoabi.

In October, JVL commended the definition of antisemitism issued by the Board of Deputies of British Jews and the Community Security Trust which is that "an antisemitic incident is any malicious act aimed at Jewish people, organisations or property, where there is evidence that the incident has antisemitic motivation or content, or that the victim was targeted because they are (or are believed to be) Jewish."

In December, in a letter to BBC director-general Tony Hall and director of news and current affairs Fran Unsworth, JVL said: "In the closing stages of an acrimonious election campaign, the BBC’s coverage of anti-semitism charges against the Labour Party has been both unbalanced and uncritical."

2020
In January, in a public letter to the Labour Party leadership candidates, JVL expressed concerns over the impact of the Board of Deputies of British Jews's 10-point pledge "to tackle the anti-semitism crisis" on Labour's independence and ability to show solidarity with Palestine. JVL expressed fears that the pledges will silence any criticism of Israel and reverse steps made under Jeremy Corbyn's leadership towards a progressive foreign policy. 

In February, the Board of Deputies of British Jews (BOD) was accused of defending the occupation of Palestine after it condemned the United Nations for listing companies linked to illegal Israeli settlements. JVL also criticised the BOD, arguing that it "will do anything it possibly can to divert attention from the reality of the occupation."

In February, JVL accused Campaign Against Antisemitism (CAA) of disproportionately targeting Labour over other political parties.

In April, in a joint statement with the Labour Representation Committee and Red Labour, JVL said that Keir Starmer being elected Labour leader is "a worrying outcome" for those inspired by Corbyn's vision as there are indications that Starmer's intention is "to marginalise, if not drive out, the left". Two days later, JVL said it hopes Starmer will "extend the same courtesy to Jews like us: active party members who take a different political view". The following week, JVL released a joint statement with Red Labour and the Labour Representation Committee based on the message of a unified grassroots coalition called 'Don't Leave, Organise'. The initiative was supported by the Bakers, Food and Allied Workers' Union, former Labour MP Laura Pidcock and retired Aslef president Tosh McDonald among others. Their statement urged socialists to remain in the Labour Party, "contribute to the efforts to re-unite the left, and be part of a renewed focus for mobilising to demand the society we need for the many". and that "...any genuine coalition of the left should include both traditional established organisations and emerging new groupings."

In May, JVL provided an analysis of more than 150 claims that Jewish Labour Movement (JLM) included in a submission to the Equality and Human Rights Commission (EHRC) in December in response to EHRC's investigation into institutional antisemitism in the Labour Party. JVL said that the JLM's claims are based on "prejudiced gossip, distortion, double standards and presumed guilt without investigation" and that evidence sent by the JLM to the EHRC is "largely worthless" as it "misstates facts and draws false conclusions". The executive summary of the analysis stated that many of the claims are "simply rumour and gossip, or unsubstantiated allegations". JVL also pointed to the Labour Party's Governance and Legal Unit report leaked in April, saying that its content "further undermines" allegations that Corbyn's team were negligent in efforts to handle allegations of antisemitism within the party and that "procedural failings [were] unjustifiably attributed to anti-semitic bias".

In July, JVL supported protests against Israel's plans to illegally annexe land in West Bank.

In the same month, the Labour Party promised to pay around £500,000 in damages from subscription payments of Labour party members to former senior staffers who claimed defamation following a BBC Panorama investigation into allegations of anti-semitism within Labour.  JVL said the Labour Party's decision to make the payments despite receiving legal advice that it would win the case was "deeply disappointing".

In August, in response to General Secretary of the Labour Party David Evans ordering Labour branches and constituency parties not to discuss investigations into antisemitism, a related libel settlement and the adoption of International Holocaust Remembrance Alliance's working definition of antisemitism, JVL said "there is nothing illegitimate" in members seeking to debate the differing views that are widespread at all levels of the party and called Evans "to withdraw this draconian attempt to silence the membership by forbidding legitimate and necessary debate on important matters of concern to us all."

See also
Independent Jewish Voices
Jewdas
Jewish Labour Movement
Jewish Socialists' Group
Socialist society (Labour Party)

References

External links

2017 establishments in the United Kingdom
Political organizations established in 2017
Jewish political organizations
Jewish organisations based in the United Kingdom
Opposition to antisemitism in the United Kingdom
Non-governmental organizations involved in the Israeli–Palestinian conflict
Organisations associated with the Labour Party (UK)